The Philippine Quality Award Program or PQA is the national quality award for Total Quality Management (TQM) in the Philippines.

History 
The Philippine Quality Award is the centerpiece program of the National Action Agenda for Productivity, the blueprint for the Philippines integrated approach to improve economy-wide productivity during the term of President Fidel V. Ramos in response to the growing challenges of globalization. It was created through Executive Order 448 on October 3, 1997. It was institutionalized on February 28, 2001, through the signing of Republic Act 9013, also known as the Philippine Quality Award Act.

Objectives
These are the three objectives of PQA:
To promote standards in organizational performance comparable to those of leading business abroad, pursuant to the country's effort to be globally competitive;
To establish a national system for assessing quality and productivity performance, thus providing local organizations regardless of size, sector and maturity with criteria and guidelines for self-assessment to guide their quality and productivity improvement efforts; and
To recognize organizations in both the private and public sector which excel in quality management and overall organizational performance, thus providing Philippine industries with benchmarks and models to emulate.

Recipients

See also
List of national quality awards
Total Quality Management

References

External links

1997 establishments in the Philippines
Awards established in 1997
Economy of the Philippines
Philippine awards
Quality awards